The Pika Lake is a fresh body of water constituting the main head lake of the Pika River on the watershed of the Saguenay River. Lac Pika is located in the unorganized territory of Lac-Achouakan, in the Lac-Saint-Jean-Est Regional County Municipality, in the administrative region of the Saguenay–Lac-Saint-Jean, in the province of Quebec, in Canada. This lake is located in the Laurentides Wildlife Reserve.

This small valley is served indirectly by the route 169 and some secondary roads for the needs of forestry, recreational tourism activities.

Forestry is the main economic activity in the sector; recreational tourism, second.

The surface of Lake Pika is usually frozen from the beginning of December to the end of March, however the safe circulation on the ice is generally made from mid-December to mid-March.

Geography 
The main watersheds near Lake Pika are:
 north side: Pika River, Riendeau Lake, Scott Lake, Clarence-Gagnon Lake, Pikauba River;
 east side: Hocquart Lake, Gobeil stream, Gobeil lake, Rivière aux Canots Est;
 south side: Riffon lake, Panache lake, rivière aux Canots, Girard stream;
 west side: Neptune lake, Cadieux lake, Audubon lake, Raquette stream, Écluse stream, Sancto stream, rivière aux Écorces.

This lake is narrowing due to a peninsula attached to the southwest shore.
This lake is mainly fed by the outlet of Lake Audubon (coming from the northwest), the outlet (coming from the West) of Lakes Pluto, Neptune de l'Arsin and Ravine, as well as the outlet of Lake Riffon ( coming from the south). The mouth of this lake is located at:
  west of Hocquart Lake (formerly known as "Petit lac Pika");
 north-west of Lac du Panache (slope of the Rivière aux Canots);
  southeast of Lac Morin;
  north-west of the confluence of the Rivière aux Canots and Rivière aux Canots Est;
  south-west of route 169;
  south of the confluence of the Pika river and the Pikauba River;
  east of Rivière aux Écorces.

Toponymy 
The toponym "Lac Pika" was formalized on December 5, 1968, by the Commission de toponymie du Québec.

Notes and references

Appendices

Related articles 
 Lac-Saint-Jean-Est Regional County Municipality
 Lac-Achouakan, a TNO
 Saguenay River
 Chicoutimi River
 Kenogami Lake
 Pikauba River
 Pika River
 List of lakes in Canada

Rivers of Saguenay–Lac-Saint-Jean
Regional county municipalities in Saguenay–Lac-Saint-Jean
Laurentides Wildlife Reserve